Andhra Pradesh Secretariat is the administrative office of the employees of the state of Andhra Pradesh, located in Velagapudi.
For AP secretariat foundation stone laid by the then chief minister N. Chandrababu Naidu & Inaugurated by shri N. Chandrababu Naidu
When the State of Andhra Pradesh was formed in 1951, the Secretariat was located in an old
Nizam structure called Peshi in the capital city of Hyderabad. The Secretariat functioned like this until the bifurcation of the state into Andhra Pradesh and Telangana. The building was to be shared in the ratio 58:42 by both the states which will continue until 2024 as per the Act and was to be transferred to Telangana in 2024. However, in February 2016 an interim Secretariat complex was inaugurated in Velagapudi, Guntur district and it started functioning from there Government of Andhra Pradesh.

References 

Amaravati
Buildings and structures in Guntur district
Administrative headquarters of state governments in India
2016 establishments in Andhra Pradesh